The discography of Italian singer Francesca Michielin consists of four studio albums, two extended plays, twenty-four singles as a lead artist and five singles as a featured artist.

Michielin's debut single, "Distratto", was released on 6 January 2012, after she won the fifth series of the Italian talent-show X Factor. The song peaked at number one on the Italian Singles Chart, and was featured on her first extended play, Distratto, which entered the top ten in Italy.

Michielin's first studio album, Riflessi di me, was released on 2 October 2012, preceded by the lead single "Sola". Other singles from the album were "Tutto quello che ho" and "Se cadrai". 
Michielin featured on Italian rapper Fedez's singles "Cigno nero" (2013) and "Magnifico" (2014), both of which achieved commercial success in Italy, being certified multi-platinum by the Federation of the Italian Music Industry.

Her second studio album, di20, was released on 23 October 2015, preceded by the singles "L'amore esiste", which became her second solo top-ten hit in Italy, "Battito di ciglia", and "Lontano". In 2016, after Michielin's debut at the Sanremo Music Festival, the album was re-released with the title di20are, reaching a new peak on the Italian FIMI chart, at number 3. The new edition featured the single "Nessun grado di separazione", released on 11 February 2016, which topped the charts in Italy. An acoustic live extended play, Nice to Meet You (Acoustic Live Solo), was also released on 30 January 2016.

Her third studio album, 2640, was released on 12 January 2018. It was preceded by the singles "Vulcano", released on 21 July 2017, and "Io non abito al mare", released on 17 November 2017. On 13 March 2020 she released her fourth studio album Feat (stato di natura), including the previous single "Cheyenne" and several collaborations with Elisa, Fabri Fibra, Måneskin, Charlie Charles, Max Gazzè and Carl Brave, among others. The album was re-released in 2021, with three additional tracks, including the number-one hit "Chiamami per nome", recorded with frequent collaborator Fedez.

Studio albums

Extended plays

Singles

As lead artist

As featured artist

Other charted songs

Album and soundtrack appearances

Music videos

References

Notes

Sources

Discographies of Italian artists